The cricopharyngeal ligament extends from the cricoid lamina to the midline of the pharynx.

Human head and neck
Ligaments
Ligaments of the head and neck